San Jerónimo District may refer to:

 Peru:
 San Jerónimo District, Andahuaylas, in Andahuaylas province, Apurímac region
 San Jerónimo District, Cusco, in Cusco province, Cusco region
 San Jerónimo District, Luya, in Luya province, Amazonas region
 Costa Rica:
 San Jerónimo District, Esparza, in Esparza (canton), Puntarenas province
 San Jerónimo District, Moravia, in Moravia (canton), San José province
 San Jerónimo District, Naranjo, in Naranjo (canton), Alajuela province

See also
 San Jerónimo (disambiguation)